Molly Crabapple (born Jennifer Caban; 1983) is an American artist and writer. She is a contributing editor for VICE and has written for a variety of other outlets, as well as publishing books, including an illustrated memoir, Drawing Blood (2015), Discordia (with Laurie Penny) on the Greek economic crisis, and the art books Devil in the Details and Week in Hell (2012). Her works are held in the permanent collections of the Museum of Modern Art, The Barjeel Art Foundation and the New-York Historical Society.

Early life
Molly Crabapple was born Jennifer Caban in 1983 in Queens, New York City, New York to a Puerto Rican father and a Jewish mother, who was the daughter of a Belarusian immigrant. Crabapple began drawing at the age of four with guidance from her mother, an illustrator who worked on toy product packaging. Crabapple has remembered herself at age 12 as a "snotty goth moppet in a pair of Doc Martens, who blared Hole on her Walkman, drew headless cheerleaders, and read the Marquis de Sade in class". Her school diagnosed her with oppositional defiant disorder (ODD) and she was expelled from the seventh grade. Crabapple has described herself in high school as "gothy, dorky, and hated". She never liked her given name, so she started using the name Molly Crabapple after a boyfriend suggested it reflected her character.

After graduating from high school at age 17, Crabapple traveled to Europe. In Paris, she was welcomed by George Whitman, the proprietor of the English-language bookstore Shakespeare and Company. After receiving a notebook as a gift she began drawing on a serious basis.

Career
Crabapple went on to work as a life model and a burlesque performer, and modeled for the Society of Illustrators. At age 19, she was modeling for SuicideGirls and responding to Craigslist ads for nude photographic modeling. Crabapple earned more money modeling than at a typical day job and continued working on her illustrations. She briefly attended the Fashion Institute of Technology, withdrawing during her first year. For four years she worked as the house artist for the Box, a New York City nightclub. Crabapple has called her time at the Box her "artistic coming-of-age".

Dr. Sketchy's Anti-Art School
 
After working as an artist's model, Crabapple became disenchanted with the structure of a formal sketch class. She believed that life drawing courses were fine for teaching students about anatomy, but that the models were treated more like objects than people, and that the sexual aspects of modeling were ignored.

In 2005, she and illustrator A. V. Phibes founded Dr. Sketchy's Anti-Art School, a burlesque life-drawing class. At a typical sketching session, artists may drink alcohol while sketching burlesque models, and play art games in a venues ranging from bars to art museums. After an artist inquired about starting a Dr. Sketchy's in Melbourne, Australia, it began to spread around the world. As of 2010, there were approximately 150 licensees using the Dr. Sketchy's name.

Comics

Crabapple has contributed her illustrations to a number of comics, often with writer John Leavitt. They worked on Backstage (2008), a webcomic at Act-i-vate that tells the story of how fire eater Scarlett O'Herring was murdered. Scarlett Takes Manhattan (2009), a graphic novel published by Fugu Press, is a prequel to Backstage. Puppet Makers (2011), a steampunk web comic that depicts an alternate history of the industrial revolution and the court of Versailles, was released for digital download by DC Comics. Crabapple also illustrated two Marvel anthologies, Strange Tales vol. 2 and Girl Comics vol. 2.

Occupy Wall Street
In September 2011, Crabapple was living in a studio near Zuccotti Park. Occupy Wall Street protesters had begun to use the park as a camp for their movement, artists began creating posters, and Crabapple contributed work and engaged in the movement. "Before Occupy I felt like using my art for activist causes was exploitive of activist causes", she told the Village Voice. "I think what Occupy let me do was it allowed me to, instead of just donating money to politics or just going to marches, it allowed me to engage my art in politics." Artists and journalists who had come from all over the world to report on the protests used Crabapple's apartment as an "impromptu salon" for the Occupy movement. In Discordia (2012), British journalist Laurie Penny remembered how "Occupy Wall Street had set up camp two streets away from Crabapple's apartment in Manhattan and we'd just spent a sleepless week documenting arrests. Molly perched at her desk churning out protest posters and handing them to activists to copy and wheat-paste all over the financial district...After three days, the word went out that there was an apartment near the protest camp where you could find hot drinks, basic medical attention and a place to charge your gadgets and file copy. The flat became a temporary sanctuary for stray activists and journalists" "I started doing protest posters", Crabapple has recalled. "And in doing these, I found my voice." Author Matt Taibbi called Crabapple "Occupy's greatest artist", noting the use of the "vampire squid" theme in her Occupy artwork. A fan of Taibbi's writing,  Crabapple had read his 2009 Rolling Stone article "The Great American Bubble Machine", in which Taibbi called Goldman Sachs "a great vampire squid wrapped around the face of humanity, relentlessly jamming its blood funnel into anything that smells like money." When Crabapple used Taibbi's metaphor as a stencil depicting a vampire squid and released it for anyone to use, it went viral throughout the Occupy movement.

On September 17, 2012, Crabapple was among a group of protesters arrested during a rally to mark the one-year anniversary of the Occupy Wall Street movement. She wrote about her experience in a CNN opinion piece. In 2013, the Museum of Modern Art acquired "Poster for the May Day General Strike, 2012" for its Occuprint Portfolio. The poster is a collaborative work by Crabapple, John Leavitt, and Melissa Dowell. It shows a woman holding a match, playing off the word "strike" as an homage to the London matchgirls' strike of 1888.

Art projects
In September 2011, Crabapple engaged in a week-long performance art piece, "Week in Hell". She locked herself inside a hotel room, covered the walls with paper, and spent the next five days filling the paper with illustrations. The project was funded on Kickstarter, garnering 745 backers and over $20,000. In pitching the work, she wrote, "I'm interested in what happens when an artist leaves their studio, their cliches, and their comfort zone and draws beyond the limits of their endurance." Every day of the endeavor was live-streamed to backers. During the week she was continuously visited by friends and fellow artists. A book documenting the project, Art of Molly Crabapple Volume 1: Week in Hell, was released in March 2012.

In 2012, Crabapple raised $30,000 on Kickstarter for The Shell Game, a project involving the creation of ten paintings about the Great Recession. She met her goal in two days, ultimately raising $64,799. An exhibition was held at New York City's Smart Clothes Gallery in April 2013. The show sold out. Uzoamaka Maduka of The American Reader wrote that the paintings were reminiscent of political cartoons during the Gilded Age and the Tammany Hall period of American history, which depicted similar subjects, like "greed, corruption, and structural treason...around the American ideal, and how that ideal is both undone and constructed by these forces." Crabapple wrote in her memoir that she regards drawing as "exposure, confrontation, or reckoning. Every line a weapon."

Illustrated journalism
Starting in 2013, Crabapple began to make trips to the Guantanamo Bay Naval Base to sketch Guantanamo military commission hearings. Her drawings, accompanied by written accounts, were first published in Vice magazine under the title "It Don't Gitmo Better Than This". Further articles and illustrations were released by Vice and The Paris Review.

In 2015, Crabapple collaborated with FUSION on an animation of a series of illustrations by Crabapple. She also wrote and narrated the video. The video portrays how the policing strategy Broken Windows Theory has been incorporated in New York City. Like other critics, Crabapple objects to the strategy as discriminating against ethnic minorities. Examples of racial discrimination enabled by the theory Crabapple mentions in the video include Eric Garner, who died after police held him in a chokehold for selling loose cigarettes, and Kang Wong, who was bloodied by police after jaywalking.
  
Scenes from the Syrian War is a collection of illustrated articles serialized in Vanity Fair and made in collaboration with an anonymous source in Syria. Using photos sent via cellphone, Crabapple recreated rare glimpses of daily life in ISIS-occupied Syria. The series so far consists of "Scenes from Daily Life in the De Facto Capital of ISIS", which focuses on the city of Raqqa, "Scenes from Daily Life Inside ISIS-Controlled Mosul", and "Scenes From Inside Aleppo: How Life Has Been Transformed by Rebel Rule".

The Paris Review also featured Crabapple's sketches of anarchist bikers who provided relief following Hurricane Maria.

Books
 

In December 2015, HarperCollins published Crabapple's illustrated memoir, Drawing Blood. The book covers her life, from her great-grandfather Sam Rothbort and her rebellious childhood in Far Rockaway, Queens, to her current illustrated journalism projects. Each of its 30 chapters focuses on a period of her life, notably her childhood, her time as a model, her tenure as house artist for the New York and London nightclub The Box, and her involvement with the Occupy movement and other post-financial crisis protests.

Drawing Blood was well received in the press, garnering attention and praise from many major news outlets. The New York Times wrote of it: "The book reads like a notebook of New York, a cultural history of a certain set. Filtered through her eyes, we see 9/11, the excesses of the aughts boom, the aftermath of the crash, Occupy Wall Street, Hurricane Sandy and onward. But what makes the book captivating and sets it apart from other descriptions of these much-reported events is how it is essentially one long glorious description of what Crabapple drew and why she drew it. ... At 32 Crabapple is a lion for her own cause—ferocious and feminist, hardworking and weepy—a new model for this century’s young woman."

In May 2018, Penguin Random House published Brothers of the Gun, co-written (and illustrated) by Crabapple and Marwan Hisham. The book offers an intimate view into the lives of three friends during the beginning of the 2011 Syrian protests through its descent into civil war and violent chaos. One friend is killed by regime forces, another became a revolutionary Islamist and Hisham, a journalist in exile in Turkey.

Brothers of the Gun received several positive reviews, including one from Angela Davis, who wrote: "A revelatory and necessary read on one of the most destructive wars of our time...In great personal detail, Marwan Hisham and Molly Crabapple poignantly capture the tumultuous life in Syria before, after, and during the war—from inside one young man’s consciousness."

In September 2019, Crabapple announced that she would write a book on the Jewish Labor Bund, to be published by Random House.

Animation
In 2010, Crabapple collaborated with Canadian singer Kim Boekbinder and filmmaker Jim Batt on the crowdsourced, stop-motion animated film I Have Your Heart. The film is based on Boekbinder's song "The Organ Donor's March". They raised $17,000 on Kickstarter from over 400 backers in April 2011.

Crabapple continued her collaboration with Boekbinder and Batt to create a series of  five videos on political topics in 2015 for the media website fusion.net. The videos combine live-drawing and animation with voice-over by Crabapple. Each one delves into a controversial or underreported issue and provides facts and commentary on it.

In 2015, Crabapple, Boekbinder, and Batt collaborated with the Equal Justice Initiative to create the video "Slavery to Mass Incarceration". Crabapple illustrates the animations, paired with Executive Director Bryan Stevenson's narration, which depict the history of mass enslavement and modern-day mass incarceration.

In 2016, Crabapple animated a video produced and narrated by Jay-Z, "The War on Drugs Is an Epic Fail", which presents a critical view of how federal drug laws instituted by the Nixon administration in 1971, as well as those implemented by New York Governor Nelson Rockefeller, targeted the Black community, resulting in the explosion of the nation's prison population.

In 2017, Crabapple collaborated with Boekbinder, the ACLU, Laverne Cox, and Zackary Drucker on a video about transgender history and resistance.

Other work
Crabapple learned Arabic and traveled to Turkey and Turkish Kurdistan. Near the Syrian border, she was briefly detained by police. Her impressions of the artistry and culture of the Ottoman Empire in the Near East influenced her style and work.

In 2012, Crabapple was one of several artists CNN commissioned to illustrate the theme of power for a digital art gallery pertaining to the 2012 presidential election, as well as the forces that drive debates over controversial issues such as money, health, race, and gender. Crabapple created the illustration "Big Fish Eat Little Fish Eat Big Fish" for the gallery.

Style and influence
Crabapple uses a crosshatch style of illustration based on Arthur L. Guptill's art technique found in Rendering in Pen and Ink (1976), originally published as Drawing with Pen and Ink (1928). Her style is influenced by Flemish Renaissance painter Pieter Bruegel the Elder, English illustrator Aubrey Beardsley, French painter Henri de Toulouse-Lautrec, Russian-American artist Zoetica Ebb, American artist Travis Louie, American photographer Clayton Cubitt, and American illustrator Fred Harper.

Der Spiegel called her approach to writing unique, saying she had created a new role, that of the political journalist-artist ("die politische Journalistenkünstlerin"), and in October 2016 Time magazine named her one of its Next Generation Leaders, "sketching from the front lines of conflicts in the U.S. and around the world" writing, "Her work is a perfect slow-media commentary on our current fast-media climate."

Publications
Brothers of the Gun (Penguin Random House, May 2018)
Drawing Blood (Harper Collins, December 2015)
Art of Molly Crabapple Volume 2: Devil in the Details (2012)
Art of Molly Crabapple Volume 1: Week in Hell (2012)
Scarlett Takes Manhattan (2009)
Dr. Sketchy's Official Rainy Day Colouring Book (2006)

References

Further reading

External links

 

 Dr. Sketchy's official website
 
 My Great-Grandfather the Bundist
 Bundism Today panel appearance held under the aegis of YIVO.

American women illustrators
American illustrators
Living people
1983 births
Fashion Institute of Technology alumni
People from Far Rockaway, Queens
Members of the Democratic Socialists of America
American people of Puerto Rican descent
American people of Belarusian-Jewish descent